The Commercial Hotel is a historic hotel building facing the courthouse square of Mountain View, Arkansas.  It is a two-story wood-frame structure, rectangular in plan, with a hip roof that has exposed rafter ends, and weatherboard siding.  A porch wraps around its principal facades, supported by box columns.  Built in 1925, it is a fine local example of commercial Craftsman architecture, and one of two surviving hotel buildings from the 1920s in the community.

The building was listed on the National Register of Historic Places in 1985.

See also
National Register of Historic Places listings in Stone County, Arkansas

References

Hotel buildings on the National Register of Historic Places in Arkansas
Buildings and structures completed in 1925
Buildings and structures in Mountain View, Arkansas
National Register of Historic Places in Stone County, Arkansas